Eupithecia husseini is a moth in the family Geometridae. It is found in Iran.

References

Moths described in 1938
husseini
Moths of the Middle East